Moraga is a surname. Notable people with the surname include:

Cherríe Moraga (born 1952), American writer
Gabriel Moraga (1765–1823), Spanish explorer
John Moraga (born 1984), American mixed martial artist
José Joaquín Moraga (1745–1785), Spanish explorer
Mario Moraga (born 1939), Chilean politician